Hatice Demirel (born ) is a Turkish weightlifter, competing in the 69 kg category and representing Turkey at international competitions. She competed at world championships, most recently at the 2014 World Weightlifting Championships.

Major results

References

Further reading
 2011 Youth Worlds
 World 2013 Women under 63kg
 World 2014 Women under 69kg
 World 2014 Women 69kg
 2015 European Women under 69kg

1994 births
Living people
Turkish female weightlifters
Place of birth missing (living people)
20th-century Turkish sportswomen
21st-century Turkish sportswomen